"The Things You Left Undone" is a song co-written and recorded by American country music artist Matraca Berg. It was released in September 1990 as the second single from the album Lying to the Moon. The song reached No. 36 on the Billboard Hot Country Singles & Tracks chart.  The song was written by Berg and Ronnie Samoset.

Critical reception
A review in Gavin Report was favorable, stating that Berg is "an extraordinary songwriter who captures your attention with her storytelling" and that the song "is sure to win her new fans. "

Chart performance

References

1990 singles
1990 songs
Matraca Berg songs
Songs written by Matraca Berg
Songs written by Ronnie Samoset
Song recordings produced by Josh Leo
RCA Records Nashville singles